The Alamosa National Wildlife Refuge is an  United States National Wildlife Refuge located in southern Colorado. It is managed by the United States Fish and Wildlife Service jointly with the Baca and Monte Vista National Wildlife Refuges. It was established in 1962 as a haven for migratory birds and other wildlife.

The site consists of wet meadows, river oxbows and riparian corridor primarily within the flood plain of the Rio Grande, and dry uplands vegetated with greasewood and saltbush. These areas support a small but rich biodiversity including songbirds, water birds, raptors, red fox,  mule deer, black bear, beaver and coyotes. Water from the Rio Grande is supplemented by water from the Closed Basin Project. The site includes a visitor center and two-mile roundtrip hiking trail. It is considered to be more wild and less intensely managed than the nearby Monte Vista refuge.

References

Protected areas of Alamosa County, Colorado
Protected areas of Conejos County, Colorado
Protected areas of Costilla County, Colorado
National Wildlife Refuges in Colorado
Protected areas established in 1962
Sangre de Cristo National Heritage Area
Wetlands of Colorado
Landforms of Alamosa County, Colorado
Landforms of Conejos County, Colorado
Landforms of Costilla County, Colorado